The Zigula or Zigua (Wazigua in Swahili) are a Bantu ethnic and linguistic people hailing from far northern Pwani Region and western southern Tanga Region. In Tanga Region they are the majority in Handeni District, northern Kilindi District and  also a historically significant population in south of the Pangani River in Pangani District. They speak the Zigula language. In 1993, the Zigua population was estimated to number 355,000 people.

The Zigua are considered as the parent tribe of the Shambaa people, the Bondei people and the Ngulu people, which today all live in north-eastern Tanzania. For instance, the king Mbegha, who was to become the leader of the Shambaa people and the grandfather of the Shambaa ruler Kimweri ye Nyumbai (†1862), was born among the Zigua.

References

 

Tanga Region
Pangani District